KHIS (89.9 FM) is a radio station broadcasting a Christian Contemporary Music format, licensed to Jackson, Missouri, United States, serving the Cape Girardeau, Missouri area.  The station is currently owned by Pure Word Communications.

KHIS is also heard in Cape Girardeau, Missouri on 107.9 FM KHEZ-LP.

References

External links
KHIS's website
 

HIS